Windsor is a ghost town in Clark County, in the U.S. state of Ohio. The precise location of the town site is unknown to the GNIS.

History
Windsor was platted in 1816.

References

Geography of Clark County, Ohio
Ghost towns in Ohio
1816 establishments in Ohio
Populated places established in 1816